Murder Story is a 1958 Australian television play.

It was based on a script by Ludovic Kennedy based on the Croydon roof top murder and starred Neva Carr-Glynn, John Ewart and Douglas Kelly. It was directed by Raymond Menmuir.

Plot
A 19-year-old, Jim Tanner is sentenced to death for the murder of Constable Albert Tomkins. In prison, Tanner is taught to read and write. But he is executed.

Cast
John Ewart as Jim Tanner
Neva Carr Glyn as his mother
Douglas   Kelly as his father
John Alden as prison chaplain
Don Crosby as Warder Graves
Deryck Barnes as Warder Barty
Myrna Dodd as Cons Tomkins Widow
Richard Meikle as Ted Clift, Jim's accomplice
Frederick Powell as inspector

Production
Kennedy's play had been performed for British TV in 1958 as an episode of Armchair Theatre.
The show was filmed live at ABC's Sydney studios at Gore Hill.

Reception
According to The Age after the show screened in Melbourne "viewers and ABV-2 staff were visibly upset by the realism created" and "ABV-2 hostess Corinne Kerby was too upset to introduce the succeeding feature."

The production was well received critically, the Woman's Weekly reviewer saying "Murder Story" and its actors engrossed—indeed hypnotised—me." The show was repeated in January 1960 - when announcing this The Sydney Morning Herald said the production "was regarded as one of the ABC's best TV productions."

There was a production of Kennedy's original play put on at the Independent Theatre in Sydney shortly after the TV play aired.

Raymond Menuir, John Edwart and Alan Seymour worked together again on Bodgie (1959).

See also
List of live television plays broadcast on Australian Broadcasting Corporation (1950s)

References

External links

1950s Australian television plays
1958 television plays